Orange iguana may refer to

Orange Iguana, an alias used by the main character in the Firebreather comic book
Orange Iguanas, a band which has appeared on the television show Chic-a-Go-Go
Orange Iguanas, team designation within the Legends of the Hidden Temple children's game show